Human Love is the third studio album by Australian band, Coloured Stone. It was released in 1986.

At the ARIA Music Awards of 1987 the album won the ARIA Award for Best Indigenous Release.

Track listing
 "Cry Cry"	- 3:27
 "Human Love" - 4:10
 "Don't Want the World to Fall Apart" - 3:14
 "The Brush" - 3:10
 "Dancing in the Moonlight" - 3:46
 "Alice Springs" - 3:46
 "Truganinni's Dreaming" - 4:33
 "That's the Girl That's in My Eyes" - 3:06
 "Easy World" - 4:10
 "Our Cry"	- 3:27
 "Waiting for the Tide" - 3:27
 "Don't Drink and Drive" - 2:50

References

1986 albums
ARIA Award-winning albums